Don Carlos Seitz was an American newspaper manager, born at Portage, Ohio, in 1862.

In 1880 he graduated from the Liberal Institute at Norway, Maine. He served as Albany correspondent (1887–89) and as city editor (1889–91) of the Brooklyn Eagle, was assistant publisher of the New York Recorder (1892–93) and managing editor of the Brooklyn World (1893–94), and thenceforth was connected with the New York World as advertising manager (1895–97) and as business manager after 1898. He died in 1935. He had a son who died at eight and a half in 1907 and two daughters.

Books  
 Discoveries in Everyday Europe (1907)  
 Writings by and about James McNeill Whistler (1910)  
 Elba and Elsewhere (1910)
 Surface Japan (1911)  
 Letters from Francis Parkman to E. G. Squier (1911)  
 The Buccaneers (1912)  
 Whistler Stories (1913)
 Braxton Bragg, general of the Confederacy (1924)
 Joseph Pulitzer; HIs Life and Letters (New York, NY: Simon & Schuster, 1924)
 Under the Black Flag: Exploits of the Most Notorious Pirates (1925)
 The Great Island: Some observations in and about the Crown Colony of Newfoundland (1926)
 ''The Dreadful Decade: Detailing Some Phases in the History of the United States from Reconstruction to Resumption, 1869-1879 (1929)

References

External links 
 
 
 

1862 births
1935 deaths
Brooklyn Eagle
American biographers
American newspaper editors
People from Portage, Ohio
People from Norway, Maine
Journalists from Ohio